Bill Siegel (December 24, 1962 – December 11, 2018) was an American documentary film producer and director. Documentaries directed by Siegel include Emmy Award-winning The Trials of Muhammad Ali and the Academy Award-nominated The Weather Underground in 2003.

He once worked for Kartemquin Films, which announced his unanticipated death the day after from unspecified causes.

References

External links 
 

1962 births
2018 deaths
American documentary film directors
Place of birth missing
Place of death missing